Rezaabad-e Mian Volan (also Romanized as Reẕāābād-e Mīān Volān) is a village in Doab Rural District, in the Central District of Selseleh County, Lorestan Province, Iran. At the 2006 census, its population was 28, in 5 families.

References 

Towns and villages in Selseleh County